Inca cuisine originated in pre-Columbian times within the Inca civilization from the 13th to the 16th century. The Inca civilization stretched across many regions, and so there was a great diversity of plants and animals used for food, many of which remain unknown outside Peru. The most important staples were various tubers, roots, and grains. Maize was of high prestige, but could not be grown as extensively as it was further north. The most common sources of meat were guinea pigs and llamas, and dried fish was common.

Foods
There were also several types of edible clay, like pasa, which was used as sauce for potatoes and other tubers, and chaco, something used by the poor or religiously devout. As in the rest of Central and South America, chili peppers were an important and highly praised part of their diet.

Vegetables and fruits

The Inca realm stretched north–south, encompassing a great variety of climate zones. In Peru in particular, the mountain ranges provide highly varied types of growing zones at different altitudes. The staples of the Incas included various plants with edible tubers and roots like potato and sweet potato, in hundreds of varieties. Slightly over 4,000 types are known to Peru and were domesticated in the region since the middle to early 3000 B.C. There was also oca (oca), which came in two varieties, sweet and bitter. The sweet variety could be eaten raw or preserved and was used as a sweetener before the arrival of sugar made from sugar cane.

Similar to oca in purpose, paiko (Dysphania ambrosioides), was a part of the Inca diet for flavoring and edible leaves. Species of the Chenopodium family in the Inca cuisine were Chenopodium pallidicaule, also known as cañihua, and Chenopodium quinoa, or quinoa, due to their ability to survive in the high altitudes of the Andes. Quinoa has grown popular in the modern world beyond the Andes due to its adaptability, nutritional value, and many uses.

Another high-altitude plant in Inca cuisine is Lupinus mutabilis, also known as tarwi or chocho. High in protein, this plant was often eaten with chilis and onions after being carefully treated, since improper treatment can leave the crop poisonous. Like chocho in protein count, Ahipa (Pachyrhizus ahipa) was another crop in Inca cuisine. It grows rapidly and has a high yield rate of the tubers that were cherished for their sweet taste like water chestnuts.

Another tuber consumed in the Andes was Tropaeolum tuberosum, also known as mashua and añu in Quechua, due to its resistance to droughts and frost. It was specially prepared and cooked to bring out the flavor that was desired as it was very bitter before doing so. So much so that it was considered an aphrodisiac and given to the Inca soldiers during campaigns to make them forget about their spouses.

Other roots that could be found in the Inca cuisine were the maka (Lepidium meyenii) and the yacón (Polymnia sonchifolia). Maka was capable of surviving in the coldest and highest areas of the Andes, thus giving it high value. Yacón was documented to be similar to a turnip in texture but was very sweet and kept well, making them popular on sea voyages. 

The insipid, starchy root ullucu, and arracacha, something like a cross between carrot and celery, were, like potatoes, used in stews and soup. Achira, a species of Canna, was a sweet, starchy root that was baked in earth ovens. Since it had to be transported up to the power center of Cuzco, it is considered to have been food eaten as part of a tradition. Although the roots and tubers provided the staples of the Inca, they were still considered lower in rank than maize (Zea mays). 

It has been found that the Inca-conquered lands were often transitioned from potato fields to maize fields, more than likely due to maize being the main ingredient of chicha.

Several species of seaweed, such as Porphyra, Durvillaea antarctica, and Ulva lactuca were part of the Inca diet and could be eaten fresh or dried. Some freshwater algae and blue algae of the genus Nostoc were eaten raw or processed for storage. In post-colonial times it has been used to make a dessert by boiling it in sugar. Pepino, a refreshing and thirst-quenching fruit, was eaten by common folk, but scorned by "pampered folk" and was considered difficult to digest. 

Another fruit that was available to the Incas was the passion fruit (Passiflora spp.) which was actually named so by the Spanish conquistadors and explorers due to the claim that the flowers of the plant contained the symbols of the passion of Christ. The fruit itself is like a pomegranate as they both have a mass of seeds covered by juicy flesh. 

A fruit that was described as an interesting snack available in the Andes during the time of the Inca Empire was the paqay (Inga feuilleei), or the guaba, which was known for its sweet, spongey substance that covers its seeds. A lesser valued fruit within Inca cuisine was the lucuma (Lucuma bifera) which was difficult to consume and had little flavor. Opposite to the lucuma in popularity, due to their tender texture and the sweet juice they produce, were the almonds within Caryocar amygdaliferum of the Chachapoyas. They were luxury goods for many generations as many have been found within early tombs of the region.

Meats

Peoples of the Altiplano had two large domesticated animals: llamas and alpacas. They were kept for their wool and used as pack animals that were often used in large caravans. The llama in particular was highly valued, and a white llama adorned in red cloth with gold earrings would often go before the Inca ruler as a royal symbol. 

Animals were believed to represent various gods depending on what color they had and were sacrificed in great number and the blood was used as a ritual anointment. Control over the sacred animals was very rigorous. Shepherds had to preserve every last part of any animal that died and present a full animal to the Inca or risk severe punishment. 

Among the food products made from the Peruvian camelids was sharqui, strips of freeze-dried meat, the origin of modern-day jerky. Another meat for royalty was that of the lizards known as Dicrodon holmbergi. It would be trapped as it attempted to consume the pods of Prosopis juliflora. After being trapped, it would be paralyzed and cooked until it was easily skinned. Afterwards, it was cooked for another ten minutes in heated sand and ashes then gutted, thus making it to be consumed immediately or preserved for up to a year. 

The meat of the common folk was the cuy, guinea pig. They were domesticated by 2000 BC and were easy to keep and multiplied rapidly. Guinea pigs were often cooked by stuffing them with hot stones. The entrails would often be used as an ingredient in soups along with potatoes, or made into a sauce. They could also be used for divination, which later brought them into disfavor by the Catholic Church.

The Incas hunted game including the wild camelids vicuña and guanaco, whitetail deer, huemul deer and viscacha, a kind of chinchilla which was hunted with lassos. Hunting rights were controlled by the state and any meat would go into the state warehouses for storage. In massive royal hunts, hunting teams would force huge herds into enclosures, and there are reports of several thousand animals being caught in a single great hunt, including puma, bear, fox and deer.

One mainstay of the Inca army and the general population was dried fish. Limpets, skates, rays, small sharks of the genus Mustelus, mullets and bonito were among the fish caught off the Peruvian coast. Other sea creatures like seabirds, penguins, sea lions and dolphins were eaten, as were various crustaceans and chitons, mussels, chanque (an abalone-like animal). 

Like other American peoples, the Inca ate animals that were often considered vermin by many Europeans, such as frogs, caterpillars, beetles, and ants. Mayfly larvae were eaten raw or toasted and ground to make loaves that could then be stored. 

The power of the Inca Empire was mighty and one of the most impressive and the advocation for storage and preservation of foods is one of the many factors that allowed for such success.

Food preparation
Cooking was often done by putting hot stones in cooking vessels and there was extensive use of the huatia, a type of earth oven and the paila, an earthenware bowl.

The Inca often got through times of food shortage because they were able to preserve and store many of their crops. It is estimated that at any given time in Incan history, there were three to seven years worth of food in the state warehouses. In the high elevations of the Andes, the Inca people would begin the process of making chuño by setting out potatoes and similar tubers out in the dry days and cold nights would freeze-dry them in a matter of days. The farmers would help the process by covering the crops to protect them from dew, and by stomping on them to release the excess water quickly. This tradition has carried on through generations as the Q’ero people of Peru make chuño a staple of their diet to survive in the harsh environment of the highlands that they call home.

In addition to fruits, vegetables and roots, the Inca also preserved meat by drying and salting it, making for complete nutritional stores. The English word jerky comes from the Quechua term ch'arki, used to primarily to refer to the sun-dried meat of the llama. 

For the preparation of the meats within Inca cuisine, a popular and efficient method was to dry various fish and meats. They would dry these meats for storage in the warehouse of the Inca Empire by various methods of food drying, including allowing the meats to dry by sunlight or, especially in the highlands, by freeze-drying.

These food preservation techniques, combined with their far-reaching road system, allowed the Inca Empire to withstand droughts and to have the means to feed a standing army. To reward such feats, the Inca empire practiced the ritual use of chicha. Chicha can be made from a variety of ingredients depending on the region and/or nation and can come in a variety of colors such as red, yellow, or even gray. The type of chicha that was held with high esteem amongst the Incas was the chicha made with maize. An extremely potent form of this type of chicha is known as sora, which is prepared in differing ways such as burying the maize in the ground until sprout or chewing the maize. Whichever it way it was done, the maize would then be cooked and strained through cloth with clean water making a brew of chicha. 

After the brewing process and the chicha was ready for consumption, it would consumed in vessels that made of varying materials such silver and gold. However, perhaps the most interesting were the ones made of wood known as keros, which often have elaborate designs and bold colors.

Quinoa, a staple plant of the Incas, was used in various ways. The leaves were often used for stews and soups. Quinoa was also used as a substitute maize in the production of chicha. The seeds were often toasted then pulverized to make various types of bread.

See also 

 Peruvian cuisine
 Bolivian cuisine
 Chilean cuisine
 Ecuadorian cuisine
 Muisca cuisine

Notes

References
Coe, Sophie D. (1994), America's First Cuisines, 
Foster, Nelson. Chilies to Chocolate: Food the Americas Gave the World The Univ. of Arizona Press.
Jacobsen, Sven-Erik. "The Worldwide Potential for Quinoa (Chenopodium quinoa Willd.)." Food Reviews International 19.1-2 (2003): 167-177.
Popenoe, Hugh, Steven R. King, Jorge Leon, Luis Sumar Kalinowski, and Noel D. Vietmeyer (1989), Lost Crops of the Incas, 

Andean civilizations
Indigenous culture of the Andes
Indigenous cuisine of the Americas
South American cuisine
Cuisine
Cuisine by culture